Finnish Energy (ET) is the trade association for Finnish energy industry sector. It is a member organisation to the Confederation of Finnish Industries EK.

Association was founded in 2004 and had in 2020 approximately 260 companies as its members.

References

External links
 

Economy of Finland
2004 establishments in Finland
Organizations established in 2004
Business organisations based in Finland